Niarchos is a genus of South American goblin spiders first described by Norman I. Platnick & N. Dupérré in 2010.

Species
 it contains twenty-three species:
Niarchos baehrae Platnick & Dupérré, 2010 — Ecuador
Niarchos barragani Platnick & Dupérré, 2010 — Ecuador
Niarchos bonaldoi Platnick & Dupérré, 2010 — Ecuador
Niarchos cotopaxi Platnick & Dupérré, 2010 — Ecuador
Niarchos elicioi Platnick & Dupérré, 2010 — Ecuador
Niarchos facundoi Platnick & Dupérré, 2010 — Ecuador
Niarchos florezi Platnick & Dupérré, 2010 — Colombia
Niarchos foreroi Platnick & Dupérré, 2010 — Ecuador
Niarchos grismadoi Platnick & Dupérré, 2010 — Ecuador
Niarchos keili Platnick & Dupérré, 2010 — Ecuador
Niarchos ligiae Platnick & Dupérré, 2010 — Ecuador
Niarchos loja Platnick & Dupérré, 2010 — Ecuador, Peru
Niarchos matiasi Platnick & Dupérré, 2010 — Ecuador
Niarchos michaliki Platnick & Dupérré, 2010 — Ecuador
Niarchos normani Dupérré & Tapia, 2017 — Ecuador
Niarchos palenque Platnick & Dupérré, 2010 — Ecuador
Niarchos ramirezi Platnick & Dupérré, 2010 — Ecuador
Niarchos rheimsae Platnick & Dupérré, 2010 — Ecuador
Niarchos santosi Platnick & Dupérré, 2010 — Ecuador
Niarchos scutatus Platnick & Dupérré, 2010 — Ecuador
Niarchos tapiai Platnick & Dupérré, 2010 — Ecuador
Niarchos vegai Platnick & Dupérré, 2010 — Ecuador
Niarchos wygodzinskyi Platnick & Dupérré, 2010 — Colombia

References

External links

Araneomorphae genera
Oonopidae